Sir Arthur Tyndall  (12 April 1891 – 27 June 1979) was a notable New Zealand civil engineer, public servant and arbitration court judge. He was born in Dunedin, New Zealand, on 12 April 1891.

In the 1939 King's Birthday Honours, Tyndall was appointed a Companion of the Order of St Michael and St George. In 1953, he was awarded the Queen Elizabeth II Coronation Medal. In the 1955 Queen's Birthday Honours, he was knighted as a Knight Bachelor, in recognition of his services as a judge of the Court of Arbitration.

References

1891 births
1979 deaths
20th-century New Zealand judges
Engineers from Dunedin
20th-century New Zealand engineers
New Zealand Companions of the Order of St Michael and St George
New Zealand Knights Bachelor
New Zealand civil engineers
New Zealand public servants